Flörsbach is a river in the municipality of Flörsbachtal in the Main-Kinzig district of Hesse, Germany.

Course

See also
List of rivers of Hesse
Spessart

References

Rivers of Hesse
Rivers of the Spessart
Rivers of Germany